Elections were held in Iba, Zambales on May 13, 2019 during the 2019 Philippine general election to decide upon the positions of mayor, vice mayor, and councillors.

Candidates

Mayor 
The incumbent mayor is Jun Rundstedt Ebdane, who has held this position since 2013.

Vice Mayor 
The incumbent vice mayor is Irene Maniquiz-Biñan.

Councilors

References

2019 Philippine local elections
Elections in Iba
May 2019 events in the Philippines
2019 elections in Central Luzon